Rutledge Creek is a  long 2nd order tributary to the Ararat River in Surry County, North Carolina.

Course
Rutledge Creek rises on the Silverleaf Creek divide about 0.5 miles southwest of Slate Mountain Church and then flows southwest to join the Ararat River about 3 miles southeast of Mount Airy, North Carolina.

Watershed
Rutledge Creek drains  of area, receives about 48.2 in/year of precipitation, has a wetness index of 317.01, and is about 63% forested.

See also
List of rivers of North Carolina

References

Rivers of North Carolina
Rivers of Surry County, North Carolina